A quilt trail is a series of painted wood or metal hung or freestanding quilt squares installed along a route emphasizing significant architecture and/or aesthetic landscapes. Currently North America has 46 quilt trails: 43 in the United States and three in Canada.

History

The first official quilt trail was begun in 2001 in Adams County, Ohio.  Donna Sue Groves wanted to honor her mother, Maxine, a noted quilter, with a painted quilt square on the family's barn in Manchester, Ohio. Though many believe that the Groves' farm is home to the first barn quilt, the first was an Ohio Star created as part of a community celebration at a nearby herb farm. The Groves farm later became part of a trail of 20 barn quilts that formed a driving trail throughout Adams County. An emerging concept, a U.S. national quilt trail that first spread across Ohio now includes barn quilts in Arkansas, Colorado, Florida, Georgia, Illinois, Indiana, Iowa, Kansas, Kentucky, Louisiana, Maryland, Michigan, Minnesota, Mississippi, Missouri, Nebraska, New Hampshire, New Jersey, New York, North Carolina, North Dakota, Oregon, Pennsylvania, South Carolina, South Dakota, Tennessee, Texas, Vermont, Virginia, West Virginia and Wisconsin. In Canada, British Columbia has developed a trail. Barn quilts also exist in Ontario and Kings County, New Brunswick.

North American quilt trails

There are quilt trails in over half of the states in the United States now.

Alabama
The Alabama Barn Quilt Trail in Lauderdale County plans to expand across the entire state.

Arkansas
Over a dozen counties in Arkansas are on the quilt trail and more are being added. Find out more at: http://arkansasquilttrails.com/

Florida
Historic downtown Trenton is considered the start of the Florida quilt trail. Many quilts can be seen along the I-75 corridor including in White Springs, Maddison, and Lake City. Trenton hosts an annual quilt festival on National Quilt Day which falls on the third Sunday in March.

Michigan 
Michigan is home to three quilt trails. The Old Mission Peninsula Quilt Barns Trail is located on the Old Mission Peninsula, a landmass north of Traverse City known for its cherry production and viticulture. Another quilt trail is located on Michigan's Thumb. An additional quilt trail is located in Mason County, part of West Michigan.

North Carolina

 North Carolina has barn quilt trails in many counties, some formally organized and mapped and others in the development stage at a local level, including in Western Rowan County. On July 8, 2019 residents of Mount Ulla installed the largest community barn quilt in the United States on the wall of a local store, West Rowan Farm, Home & Garden. The Mount Ulla Community Barn Quilt measures 500 square feet, twenty square feet larger than the previous title holder, a community barn quilt in Ashland, Kansas.

Pennsylvania
Pennsylvania Community Partnerships RC & D is currently in the planning stages of a series of quilt trails (PA Quilt Trails), including a railroad quilt trail running from Lewistown to Harrisburg.

Tennessee 
Appalachian Resource Conservation & Development maintains the online quilt trail database for the six-county region of Northeast Tennessee.

Utah 

Barn Quilts of Utah is currently establishing and maintaining quilt trails throughout Utah. The original trail is Top of Utah Barn Quilt Trail and additional trails are being added.

See also
 Barn advertisement

References

External links
Barn Quilt Trails across America
U.S. 23 Quilt Trail Image Gallery
Donna Sue Groves
Quilt Trails of Western North Carolina
North Carolina Barn Quilt Map
Ontario Barn Quilt Trails
Alabama Barn Quilt Trail
Barn Quilts of Utah
Top of Utah Barn Quilt Trail

Auto trails in the United States
Quilting
Roads in British Columbia
Barns in the United States